Vasilyev, Vasiliev or Vassiliev or Vassiljev, or Vasilyeva or Vasilieva (feminine), is a common Russian surname that is derived from the Russian given name Vasiliy (equivalent of Basil) and literally means "Vasiliy's". It may refer to:

Alexander Vasilyev (musician) (born 1969), lead singer and guitar player for the Russian rock band Splean
Alexander Vasilyev (disambiguation), multiple people
Alexander Vassiliev, Russian journalist, writer and espionage historian
Boris Vasilyev (disambiguation), multiple people
Denys Vasilyev (born 1987), Ukrainian footballer
Dimitry Vassiliev (born 1979), Russian ski jumper
Dmitry Vasilyev (biathlete) (born 1962), Soviet biathlete and Olympic champion
Dmitri Vasilyev (runner), Russian runner who participated in the 2000 Summer Olympics
Dmitri Vasilyev (director) (1900–1984), Soviet film director
Dmitri Vladimirovich Vasilyev (footballer) (born 1977), Russian international footballer with FC Shinnik Yaroslavl and FC Rubin Kazan
Dmitri Vyacheslavovich Vasilyev (born 1985), Russian footballer with FC Shinnik Yaroslavl and FC Krylia Sovetov Samara
Feodosy Vasilyev (?-1711), Russian Old Believer and founder of the Fedoseevtsy movement
Fyodor Vasilyev (1850–1873), Russian painter
Georgi Vasilyev (1899–1946), Soviet film director and screenwriter
Grigoriy Vasilyev, real name of Grigory Soroka (1823–1864), Russian painter
Konstantin Vasilyev (1942–1976), Russian painter
Konstantin Vassiljev (1984–), Estonian footballer
Leonid Vasiliev (1881-1966), Russian Soviet parapsychologist and physiologist
Margarita Vasileva (born 2005), Bulgarian rhythmic gy
Mikhail Vasilyev (explorer) (1770–1847), Russian seafarer and Vice Admiral
Mikhail Vasilyev (handballer) (born 1961), Russian handball player
Nadezhda Vasilyeva
Nikolai Vasilyev (disambiguation), multiple people
Olga Vasilyeva (disambiguation), multiple people
Oleg Kimovich Vasilyev (born 1959), Russian Olympic and world pairs figure skating champion
Oleg Vassiliev (1931–2013), Russian artist
Sergei Vasilyev (1900–1959), Soviet film director
Sergey Vasilyev (actor) (1827-1862), Russian stage actor
Sofia Vassilieva, Russian American actress
Svetlana Vasilyeva
The Vasilyev brothers, the alias of Soviet film directors Georgi and Sergei Vasilyev, creators of the film Chapayev
Uliana Vasilyeva (born 1995), Russian curler
Vadim Vasilyev (football) (born 1965), vice president of the French football club AS Monaco FC
Vadim Vasilyev (footballer) (born 1972), Azerbaijani footballer
Valeri Vasiliev (1949–2012), Russian (Soviet) ice hockey player
Vasily Vasilyev (1818–1900), Russian sinologist and academician
Victor Anatolyevich Vassiliev (born 1956), Russian mathematician, known for the Vassiliev invariant in knot theory
Viktor Konstantinovich Vasilyev (1887–1961), Russian and Soviet naval officer
Vladimir Vasiliev (martial arts), Russian martial arts instructor
Vladimir Vasiliev (ballet dancer) (born 1940), Russian ballet dancer
Vladimir Vasilyev (writer), Russian writer
Yana Vassilyeva (born 1981), Kazakhstani handball player

See also 
 Vasilyevo
 Vasiļjevs

Russian-language surnames
Patronymic surnames
Surnames from given names